Stadionul Orășenesc, usually named Olimpia Bălți Stadium, is a multi-use stadium in Bălți, Moldova.  It is currently used mostly for football matches and is the home ground of CSF Bălți.The stadium holds 5,953 people.

References

External links
 Olimpia Bălți Stadium

Football venues in Moldova
Buildings and structures in Bălți
CSF Bălți